Water transport in India has played a significant role in the country's economy and is indispensable to foreign trade. India is endowed with an  extensive network of waterways in the form of rivers, canals, backwaters, creeks and a long coastline accessible through the seas and oceans. It has the largest carrying capacity of any form of transport and is most suitable for carrying bulky goods over long distances. It is one of the cheapest mode of transport in India, as it takes advantage of natural track and does not require huge capital investment in construction and maintenance except in the case of canals. Its fuel efficiency contributes to lower operating costs and reduced environmental impact due to carbon. India has 14500 km of inland waterways. Out of which only 5685 km are navigable by mechanized vessels.

Since 1947, India has made great progress in shipping and gradually became the second largest shipping country in Asia and sixth largest in the world. Indian ships ply on most of the shipping route of the world. India has a longer coastline of 6100 km long and have only 12 major ports. They are Mumbai , Kandla, Jawaharlal Nehru Port(at Nehru Seve), Marmagaon, New Mangalore, Kochi on the west coast and Kolkata, Chennai, Haldia, Paradeep, Vishakhapatnam and Tuticorin on the east coast.
 
Jawaharlal Nehru port of Mumbai has been developed as one of the major ports. It is the only fully mechanized port of India. The biggest port is Mumbai which handles largest number of ships as well as trade. Kandla port in Gujarat compensates the loss of Karachi Port (Pakistan). Vishakhapatnam is the third largest port of India. Kolkata is the largest inland port of Asia.

Inland Waterways Authority of India vision to raise India's 111 national waterway's current cargo handling capacity from 55 MT in 2017-18 and 72 MT in 2018–19 to 100 MT by 2021–22.

Benefits of waterways transport 

Water transport has received significant attention in recent times as logistical costs in India are some of the highest among major countries—18 percent in India versus 8-10 percent in China and 10-12 percent in the European Union. To increase the share of waterways in inland transport, the National Waterways Act, 2016 was passed which proposed 106 additional National Waterways. This has the potential to greatly reduce the cost of transportation and lower the nation's carbon footprint by moving traffic from surface roads and railroads to waterways. Prime Minister Narendra Modi launched the first Ro-Ro ferry service in Gujarat in October 2017.

Freight transport by waterways is highly under-utilized in India compared to other large countries and geographic areas such as the United States, China and the European Union. The total cargo moved (in tonne kilometres) by inland waterways was 0.1 percent of the total inland traffic in India, compared to the 21 percent figure for the United States.

Inland Canals and Inland Waterways 

India has an extensive network of inland waterways in the form of rivers, canals, backwaters and creeks. About  of cargo are moved annually through these waterways using mechanized vessels and country boats.

Cargo transported in an organized manner is confined to a few waterways in Goa, West Bengal, Assam and Kerala. Inland waterways consist of the Ganges-Bhagirathi-Hooghly rivers, the Brahmaputra, the Barak river, the rivers in Goa, the backwaters in Kerala, inland waters in Mumbai and the deltaic regions of the Godavari-Krishna rivers.

Notes:
IWAI - Inland Waterways Authority of India 
CIWTC - Central Inland Water Transport Corporation 
KSINCL- Kerala State Inland Navigation Company Limited

Coastal Waterways or Coastline Waterways 

Transport facilities available by ship along India's vast coastline are part of the coastal shipping system. Coastal shipping is one of the most important aspects of Indian Transport system.The 
country has a coastline of nearly 7,517 km including the coastline of Andaman & Nicobar Islands and Lakshadweep Island. India has the largest merchant shipping fleet among developing countries and ranks 19th worldwide. Past decades saw a sharp decline in the country's coastal shipping operation. In 1961, there were 97 ships and in 1980 the number was down to 56. The shipping policy committee has recommended that Indian ships secure 100% of the country's coastal trade.

See also 

 Bharatmala, Road transport in India
 Expressways of India
 Setu Bharatam, river road bridge development in India
 List of National Waterways in India
 Rail transport in India
 Sagar Mala project, national water port development connectivity scheme
 Transport in India
 UDAN, national airport development connectivity scheme

References

External links
 http://pib.nic.in/newsite/erelease.aspx?relid=63559

 
Geography of India